Bar Chamer Kand Tehsil is a subdivision located in Bajaur District, Khyber Pakhtunkhwa, Pakistan.

Geography

Adjacent administrative units
Sirkanay District, Kunar Province, Afghanistan (north)
Nawagai Subdivision (east)
Safi Subdivision, Mohmand District (southwest)

History

Bar Chamer Kand Subdivision was part of the former Federally Administered Tribal Areas until the region was merged with Khyber Pakhtunkhwa on May 31, 2018. It was previously a tehsil before the FATA Interim Governance Regulation, 2018 was signed by President Mamnoon Hussain. It got upgraded to a subdivision when FATA was merged into Khyber Pakhtunkhwa.

Demographics

Bar Chamer Kand Subdivision has a population of 2,868 people and 336 households according to the 2017 census.

See also 
 List of tehsils of Khyber Pakhtunkhwa

References 

Tehsils of Khyber Pakhtunkhwa
Populated places in Bajaur District